Želimir Puljić (7 March 1947) is Croatian prelate of the Catholic Church who currently serves as the apostolic administrator of Split-Makarska since 2023. He previously served as the archbishop of Zadar from 2010 to 2023 and bishop of Dubrovnik from 1989 to 2010.

Ordained to the priesthood on 24 March 1974, for the Diocese of Mostar-Duvno, Puljić was appointed Bishop Dubrovnik on 7 December 1989 and was ordained into that office on 14 January 1990. Bishop Puljić became the archbishop of Zadar on 15 March 2010.

In October 2010, Archbishop Puljić, following up on the wish of his predecessor, conveyed a small silver reliquary containing a portion of the relics of Saint Simeon to Archbishop Theofylactus of Jordan, representative of Theophilos III, Greek Orthodox Patriarch of Jerusalem, for the monastery of Saint Simeon the Godbearer in Katamon, Jerusalem. It is popularly believed that the relics of Saint Simeon, one of the patron saints of Zadar, lie in the Church of Saint Simeon, in Zadar.

Puljić is a member of the European Academy of Sciences and Arts.

On 14 January 2023, the Apostolic Nunciature announced that the Pope accepted Puljić's renunciation from the service and appointed Milan Zgrablić his successor.

Notes

External links

1947 births
Living people
People from Mostar
Croats of Bosnia and Herzegovina
Bishops of Dubrovnik
Archbishops of Zadar
Bishops appointed by Pope John Paul II
Bishops appointed by Pope Benedict XVI
20th-century Roman Catholic bishops in Croatia
21st-century Roman Catholic archbishops in Croatia